Diane Silvers Ravitch (born July 1, 1938) is a historian of education, an educational policy analyst, and a research professor at New York University's Steinhardt School of Culture, Education, and Human Development. Previously, she was a U.S. Assistant Secretary of Education. In 2010, she became "an activist on behalf of public schools". Her blog at DianeRavitch.net has received more than 36 million page views since she began blogging in 2012. Ravitch writes for the New York Review of Books.

Early life and education
Ravitch was born into a Jewish family in 1938 in Houston, Texas, where she went to public schools from kindergarten through high school graduation from San Jacinto High School in 1956. She is one of eight children. She is a graduate of Wellesley College and earned a PhD from Columbia University.

Career

Ravitch began her career as an editorial assistant at the New Leader magazine, a socialist journal founded and supported by Eugene V. Debs and Norman Thomas. In 1975, she became a historian of education with a PhD from Columbia University. At that time she worked closely with Teachers College president Lawrence A. Cremin, who was her mentor.

Ravitch was appointed to public office by Presidents George H. W. Bush and Bill Clinton. She served as Assistant Secretary of Education under Secretary of Education Lamar Alexander from 1991 to 1993 and his successor Richard Riley appointed her to serve as a member of the National Assessment Governing Board, which supervises the National Assessment of Educational Progress; she was a member of NAGB from 1997 to 2004. From 1995 to 2005 she held the Brown Chair in Education Studies at the Brookings Institution

From 1994 to 2020, Ravitch was Research Professor of Education at New York University’s Steinhardt School of Culture, Human Development, and Education.

Ravitch participated in a "blog debate" called "Bridging Differences" with Steinhardt School colleague Deborah Meier on the website of Education Week from February 26, 2007 until September 2012.

In April 2012, Ravitch launched an education policy blog, posting up to ten times daily. Her blog is one of the leading education forums in the world, having received more than 36 million page views. She supports the importance of professional teachers and democratic public schools, and she criticizes high-stakes standardized tests and privatization of public schools by privately-managed charters and vouchers for private schools.

In 2013, Ravitch joined forces with writer and former teacher, Anthony Cody, to create the Network for Public Education which is a foundation dedicated to fighting against educational corporate reforms. Since President Trump appointed Betsy DeVos as Secretary of Education, membership in NPE has increased from 22,000 to 330,000.

Educational views
Ravitch's first book The Great School Wars (1974) is a history of New York City public schools. It described alternating eras of centralization and decentralization. It also tied periodic controversies over public education to periodic waves of immigration.

Her book The Language Police (2003) was a criticism of both left-wing and right-wing attempts to stifle the study and expression of views deemed unworthy by those groups. The Amazon.com review summarizes Ravitch's thesis as "pressure groups from the political right and left have wrested control of the language and content of textbooks and standardized exams, often at the expense of the truth (in the case of history), of literary quality (in the case of literature), and of education in general." Publishers Weekly wrote: "Ravitch contends that these sanitized materials sacrifice literary quality and historical accuracy in order to escape controversy."

Ravitch's writings on racial and cultural diversity were summarized by sociologist Vincent N. Parrillo:

Reading instruction 
Ravitch said that she "supports the teaching of phonics when appropriate". She was critical of the then New York mayor Michael Bloomberg who, after taking control over New York public schools, replaced phonics with balanced literacy helped by Joel Klein, the then chancellor of the New York City Department of Education. Klein credited balanced literacy with raising the city’s fourth-grade reading scores. Ravitch rebutted that claim by noting that the rise in reading scores occurred in 2002—before Klein became chancellor and implemented balanced literacy.

At the same time Ravitch said that she could not bring herself to believe in "the science of reading". According to her, "there is no 'science of mathematics,' no 'science of science,' no 'science of history'".

School choice and testing
Being initially a proponent of No Child Left Behind, by 2010 Ravitch renounced her earlier support for high-stakes testing and school choice. She critiqued the punitive uses of accountability to fire teachers and close schools, as well as replacing public schools with charter schools and relying on superstar teachers. She wrote, "I no longer believe that either approach will produce the quantum improvement in American education that we all hope for." On her blog, she often cited low-performing charters, frauds, corruption, incompetent charter operators, exclusionary policies practiced by charters, and other poor results that diverted funding from public schools into private hands. High-stakes testing, "utopian" goals, "draconian" penalties, school closings, privatization, and charter schools didn't work, she concluded. "The best predictor of low academic performance is poverty—not bad teachers."

Ravitch said that the charter school and testing reform movement was started by billionaires and "right wing think tanks like The Heritage Foundation" for the purpose of destroying public education and teachers' unions. She reviewed the documentary Waiting for Superman, directed by Davis Guggenheim, as "propagandistic" (pro-charter schools and anti-public schools), studded with "myths" and at least one "flatly wrong" claim. Of Education Secretary Arne Duncan's Race to the Top program, Ravitch said in a 2011 interview it "is an extension of No Child Left Behind ...[,] all bad ideas." She concluded "We are destroying our education system, blowing it up by these stupid policies. And handing the schools in low-income neighborhoods over to private entrepreneurs does not, in itself, improve them. There's plenty of evidence by now that the kids in those schools do no better, and it's simply a way of avoiding their - the public responsibility to provide good education."

Repudiating the policies she had formerly espoused, Ravitch wrote The Death and Life of the Great American School System: How Testing and Choice Undermine Education (2010), which became a surprise best seller. One reviewer noted that "Ravitch exhibits an interesting mix of support for public education and the rights of teachers to bargain collectively with a tough-mindedness that some on the pedagogical left lack."

Her next book Reign of Error: The Hoax of the Privatization Movement and Its Danger to America’s Public Schools was a national bestseller. She describes in detail the policies that are needed to improve the lives of children and families, based on research, and beginning with prenatal care for all pregnant women. Data show that the U.S. lags other nations in providing prenatal care and high-quality preschool, but leads other advanced nations in rates of child poverty and inequality of wealth and income.

National standards and Common Core
During the 1980s, Ravitch began calling for voluntary national standards in education. She became associated with Core Knowledge movement, championed by E. D. Hirsch. During her stint as an assistant secretary of education, she was tasked to develop national standards, even though the federal government did not have the authority to make the states adopt them. By 2007, Ravitch no longer accepted the free-market components of education reform. She continued to work with Hirsch calling for more attention to curriculum and instruction. In 2008 she became a co-chair of the board of the newly created Common Core, Inc. Funded by the Bill & Melinda Gates Foundation, the research-based Curriculum Maps project presented a "comprehensive, coherent sequence of thematic curriculum units connecting the skills outlined in the CCSS with suggested student objectives, texts, activities, and much more".

In her book The Death and Life of the Great American School System: How Testing and Choice Undermine Education, published in 2010, Ravitch proclaimed:

Every school should have a well-conceived, coherent curriculum. A curriculum is not a script, but a set of general guidelines. Students should regularly engage in the study and practice of the liberal arts and sciences: history, literature, geography, the sciences, civics, mathematics, the arts, and foreign languages, as well as health and physical education.

She continued:

Nations such as Japan and Finland have developed excellent curricula that spell out what students are supposed to learn in a wide variety of subjects. If we are willing to learn from top-performing nations, we should establish a substantive national curriculum that declares our intention to educate all children in the full range of liberal arts and sciences, as well as physical education. The curriculum would designate the essential knowledge and skills that students need to learn.

In September 2010, Ravitch left Common Core, Inc., becoming disillusioned by the Gates’-funded Common Core. The 3rd edition of the book, published in 2016, changed the tone accordingly:

In the original edition of this book, I expressed my view that the nation needs national standards. I thought that the culture wars of the 1990s are behind us. I believed that common sense would prevail and that professionals in every field could agree on the knowledge and skills that all citizens needed. I did not make any recommendations about national tests.

The fundamental error of the Common Core standards is that they were written by a small group of people without the involvement of classroom teachers and scholars in the respective fields. They were written with remarkable speed but without any public review process. There were no means by which to revise them after they were published. States could add up to 15 percent additional content, but could subtract or change nothing. It was a missed opportunity to do it right. The toxicity of the Common Core standards persuaded me that it is fruitless to rely on national curriculum standards as a solution to education problems.

Ravitch turned her attention to poverty and racial segregation as the main causes of low student achievement. Ravitch claims that the Common Core "was a rush job, and the final product ignored the needs of children with disabilities, English-language learners and those in the early grades". She says that the country needs "schools where all children have the same chance to learn. That doesn’t require national standards or national tests, which improve neither teaching nor learning, and do nothing to help poor children at racially segregated schools".

Personal life
She married Richard Ravitch (who later served as Lieutenant Governor of New York) in 1960 and they divorced in 1986. They have two sons, both of which were sent to private schools; a third son died of leukemia at the age of 2.

Ravitch lives in Southold, New York. Her longtime companion is Mary Butz, a retired New York City public school principal who also administered a progressive principal-training program. She and Butz were married on December 12, 2012.

Bibliography

 The Great School Wars: New York City, 1805-1973 (1974, reissued 1988, 2000) 
 The Revisionists Revised: A Critique of the Radical Attack on the Schools (1978) 
 Schools in Cities: Consensus and Conflict in American Educational History (1983) 
 Against Mediocrity: The Humanities in America's High Schools (1984) 
 Challenges to the Humanities (1985) 
 The Schools We Deserve (1985) 
 The Troubled Crusade: American Education, 1945–1980 (1983) 
 What Do Our 17-Year-Olds Know: A Report on the First National Assessment of History and Literature (1989) 
 The American Reader : Words That Moved a Nation (1990) 
 National Standards in American Education: A Consumer's Guide (1995) 
 New Schools for a New Century: The Redesign of Urban Education (1997) 
 City Schools: Lessons from New York (2000) 
 Left Back: A Century of Battles Over School Reform (2000) 
 Kid Stuff: Marketing Sex and Violence to America's Children (2003) 
 Making Good Citizens: Education and Civil Society (2003) 
 The Language Police: How Pressure Groups Restrict What Students Learn (2003) 
 Forgotten Heroes of American Education: The Great Tradition of Teaching Teachers (2006) 
 The English Reader: What Every Literate Person Needs to Know (2006) 
 EdSpeak: A Glossary of Education Terms, Phrases, Buzzwords, and Jargon (2007) 
 The Death and Life of the Great American School System: How Testing and Choice Are Undermining Education (2010) 
 Reign of Error: The Hoax of the Privatization Movement and the Danger to America's Public Schools (2013) 
 Slaying Goliath: The Passionate Resistance to Privatization and the Fight to Save America's Schools (2020) 
Ravitch has published hundreds of articles in scholarly and popular journals.

Awards
Delta Kappa Gamma Educators' Award
Ambassador of Honor Award, English-Speaking Union
 Phi Beta Kappa visiting scholar, 1984–85
 Henry Allen Moe Prize, American Philosophical Society, 1986
 designated honorary citizen, State of California Senate Rules Committee, 1988, for work on state curriculum
 Alumnae Achievement Award, Wellesley College, 1989
 Medal of Distinction, Polish National Council of Education, 1991
 Literary Lion, New York Public Library, 1992
 Award for Distinguished Service, New York Academy of Public Education, 1994
 Horace Kidger Award, New England History Teachers Association, 1998
 Award of Excellence, St. John's University School of Education, 1998
 John Dewey Education Award, United Federation of Teachers, 2005
 Guggenheim fellowship, 1977
 Honorary Life Trustee, New York Public Library
 John Dewey Award, United Federation of Teachers, New York City, 2005
 Gaudium Award from the Breukelein Institute, 2005
 Uncommon Book Award, Hoover Institution, 2005
 NEA Friend of Education, 2010
 American Association of School Administrators, American Education Award, 2011
 Outstanding Friend of Education Award, Horace Mann League, 2011
 Distinguished Service Award, National Association of Secondary School Principals, 2011
 The Deborah W. Meier Hero in Education Award from FairTest, 2011
 Daniel Patrick Moynihan Prize Winner from the American Academy of Political and Social Science, 2011
 Politico 50, one of the 50 people whose ideas are shaping our society, 2014
 Grawemeyer Award in Education for Death and Life of the Great American School System, 2014

Honorary degrees
Amherst College
Middlebury College Language Schools
Ramapo College
Reed College
Saint Joseph's College (New York)
Siena College
State University of New York
Union College
Williams College
Columbia College, Chicago

Manhattanville College

Queens College, City University of New York

See also
 The Inconvenient Truth Behind Waiting for Superman

References

External links
 Diane Ravitch official website
   (Review of Language Police)
 
 Diane Ravitch: No Child Left Behind Has Left US Schools with Legacy of "Institutionalized Fraud" — video by Democracy Now!
 Waiting for Superman: Fact or Fiction? BAM! Radio podcast discussion.

 

1938 births
American education writers
American historians of education
American political writers
Clinton administration personnel
George H. W. Bush administration personnel
Jewish American writers
Living people
People from Brooklyn
People from Houston
San Jacinto High School alumni
Scholars of American education
Steinhardt School of Culture, Education, and Human Development faculty
Teachers College, Columbia University alumni
Wellesley College alumni
HuffPost bloggers
Historians from New York (state)
Historians from Texas
Brookings Institution people